Porte des Pierres Dorées (literally Gate of the Golden Stone) is a commune in the department of Rhône, eastern France. The municipality was established on 1 January 2017 by merger of the former communes of Pouilly-le-Monial (the seat) and Liergues. On 1 January 2019, the former commune Jarnioux was merged into Porte des Pierres Dorées.

Monuments

See also 
Communes of the Rhône department

References 

Communes of Rhône (department)